John Diedrich Spreckels (August 16, 1853 – June 7, 1926), the son of German-American industrialist Claus Spreckels, founded a transportation and real estate empire in San Diego, California, in the late 19th and early 20th centuries. The entrepreneur's many business ventures included the Hotel del Coronado and the San Diego and Arizona Railway, both of which are credited with helping San Diego develop into a major commercial center.

Upon his death he was eulogized as "One of America's few great Empire Builders who invested millions to turn a struggling, bankrupt village into the beautiful and cosmopolitan city San Diego is today."

Early years
The oldest of five children, Spreckels was born in Charleston, South Carolina, though the family soon moved to New York City. Spreckels attended Oakland College and then the Polytechnic College in Hannover, Germany, where he studied chemistry and mechanical engineering until 1872. He returned to California and began working for his father, Claus Spreckels, who had grown extremely wealthy in the sugar business. In 1876 he went to the Hawaiian Islands, where he worked for his father's sugar business, Spreckels Sugar Company.

Entrepreneur beginnings
In 1880, with $2 million in capital, he organized J. D. Spreckels and Brothers, a company to establish a trade between the mainland United States and the Hawaiian Islands. The company began with one sailing vessel, the Rosario, and later controlled two large fleets of sail and steam ships. The firm also engaged extensively in sugar refining, and became agents for leading sugarcane plantations in Hawaii. Much of the  development of commercial interests between the United States and Hawaii is due to this firm.

The shipping and passenger line of this enterprise was the Oceanic Steamship Company, which was founded by J.D. Spreckels in 1881. Its inaugural service was between California and Hawaii and, later, also from California to Australia, New Zealand, Samoa and Tahiti. The various of the lines’ ships transported passengers, sugar and/or other food cargoes and provided mail service. For decades, the company provided the only mail service between the U.S. and Australia and New Zealand. The Oceanic ships that transported mail to Australia and New Zealand were the Alameda (3000 horsepower plant), Mariposa (3000 horsepower plant), the steamer Zealandia, the Sierra, the Sonoma and the Ventura. The Australia provided a 33-day direct mail service to Tahiti. In 1926 Oceanic became a subsidiary of Matson Navigation Company, a company which J.D.’s father—Claus Spreckels—had early financed.
Prior to its becoming associated with Matson, Oceanic had under J.D.’s control owned a total 17 ships, which were the iron ship Alameda (1883), the wood schooner Anna (1881), the iron steamer Australia (1875), the wood brigantine Claus Spreckels (1879), the wood brigantine Consuelo (1880), the wood brigantine Emma Augusta (1867), the wood brigantine John D. Spreckels (1880), the iron ship Mariposa (1883), the two mast schooner Rosario (1879), the wood brigantine Salina, the passenger ship Sierra (1900), the passenger liner Sonoma (1900), the Suez (1876), the Ventura (1900), the wood brigantine W.H. Dimond (1881), the wood brigantine William G. Irwin (1881), and the Zealandia (1875).

In October 1877, John Diedrich Spreckels married Lillie Siebein in Hoboken, New Jersey, and together they had four children: Grace (born September 1878), Lillie (born November 1879), John (born April 1883), and Claus (born March 1888). They first lived in the Kingdom of Hawaii and then in San Francisco. In 1887, Spreckels visited San Diego on his yacht Lurline to stock up on supplies. Impressed by the real estate boom then taking place, he invested in the construction of a wharf and coal bunkers at the foot of Broadway (then called "D" Street). That boom ended soon but Spreckels' interest in San Diego would last for the rest of his life.

He acquired control of the Coronado Beach Company, the Hotel del Coronado and Coronado Tent City; he bought the San Diego street railway system, changing it from horse power to electricity, in 1892. The Hotel del Coronado was owned by the Coronado Beach Company which was originally capitalized with US$3 million. At the time of capitalization the original company directors were E.S. Babcock, John D. Spreckels, Captain Charles T. Hinde, H.W. Mallett, and Giles Kellogg. The Coronado Beach Company was responsible for numerous other investments in the Coronado, California, area. Before investing in the Coronado Beach Company, Spreckels waited for his close friend—Captain Charles T. Hinde—to join him. They jointly invested and managed new businesses.

For a time, Spreckels was owner of the San Francisco Call, then a morning newspaper. While still living in San Francisco, he continued investing in San Diego newspapers, buying The San Diego Union in 1890 and the San Diego Evening Tribune in 1901. He moved his family permanently to San Diego immediately after the 1906 San Francisco earthquake.

Relocation to San Diego
In the next decades, Spreckels became a millionaire many times over, and the wealthiest man in San Diego. At various times he owned all of Coronado Island, the San Diego-Coronado Ferry System, the Union-Tribune Publishing Co., the San Diego Electric Railway, the San Diego & Arizona Railway, and Belmont Park in Mission Beach. He built several downtown buildings, including the Union Building in 1908, the Spreckels Theater Building in 1912, the Hotel San Diego, and the Golden West Hotel. He employed thousands of people and at one time he paid 10% of all the property taxes in San Diego County.

Spreckels was president of several companies, including the Oceanic Steamship Company, operating a mail and passenger line to Hawaii and Australia, the Western Sugar Refining Company, the Coronado Water Company, the San Diego and Coronado Ferry Company, the San Diego and Coronado Transfer Company, the Pajaro Valley Consolidated Railroad Company, the San Diego Electric Railway, and the San Diego & Arizona Railway Company.

Spreckels Mansion 
Spreckels' first permanent residence in the San Diego area was the Spreckels Mansion, located at 1630 Glorietta Boulevard. The Mansion sat on five acres of land overlooking Glorietta Bay across from the Hotel del Coronado. In 1906, Spreckels, 53, contracted Architect Harrison Albright to design and build the Mansion. The building, designed with the simple, classic lines of Italian Renaissance, was complete in 1908 with six bedrooms, three baths, a parlor, dining room and library at the cost of $35,000. At that time, Spreckels' Mansion featured a brass cage elevator, a marble staircase with leather-padded handrails, skylights, marble floors and some of the Island's most spectacular gardens. The home was built with reinforced steel and concrete, an earthquake precaution Spreckels insisted upon after living through the 1906 San Francisco earthquake. Spreckels lived in the Glorietta Boulevard mansion until his death in 1926. It is now a popular boutique hotel, the Glorietta Bay Inn.  

John D. Spreckels built the beach house, located at 1043 Ocean Boulevard in Coronado, designed by architect Harrison Albright (1866-1932). John D. Spreckels built the Ocean Boulevard beach house for his son Claus as a wedding present in 1910 and Claus's widow, Ellis, lived there until her death in 1967. The beach house mansion is the location of the 2011 accidental death of 6-year-old Max Shacknai, son of Jonah Shacknai, former CEO of Medicis Pharmaceutical, and the contested suicide of Jonah Shacknai's girlfriend, Rebecca Zahau.

Transportation and infrastructure

San Diego Electric Railway

The San Diego Electric Railway (SDERy) was a San Diego-based, light rail mass transit system founded by Spreckels in 1892. Spreckels' strategy involved buying up several failed downtown horse- and cable-drawn trolley routes, consolidating and standardizing the trackage, and electrifying the resulting unified street railway system.

Over the years, the SDERy constructed new lines to connect San Diego's burgeoning downtown with the region's up-and-coming outlying communities, including Mission Beach, Pacific Beach, and Normal Heights (developments where Spreckels owned the bulk of the land). Spreckels' underlying philosophy in this regard can best be summed up as follows:

At its peak, the SDERy's routes would operate throughout greater San Diego over some 165 miles (266 kilometers) of track. And though the system had operated continuously for more than half a century, steadily declining ridership (due in large part to the phenomenal rise in popularity of the automobile) ultimately led the company to discontinue all streetcar service in favor of bus routes in 1949.

San Diego Class 1 Streetcars

One of Spreckels' major contributions to the city of San Diego was his commitment to the construction of Balboa Park in preparation of the Panama-California Exposition. As the owner of the San Diego Electric Railway Company, he also developed a unique fleet of special streetcars that could handle the large crowds attending this event. Following the Exposition, the Class 1 streetcars would go on to provide a continuing public transportation service for the city of San Diego over the next 27 years.

An evolution from previous streetcar models, the Class 1s were designed with artistry, state-of-the-art technology and San Diego's unique climate in mind. Under Spreckels' guise, the engineers of SDERy drafted up plans that took elements from both the "California Car" and the "Closed Car" designs and refashioned them into a new, modern transit fleet. Their plans were sent to the Saint Louis Car Company (SLCCo) where these beautiful, Arts & Crafts-style streetcars were built and shipped out to San Diego. Ultimately, the Class 1 streetcars ran all over San Diego, from Coronado through Downtown, Mission Hills, Ocean Beach, North Park, Golden Hill, and Kensington. They even briefly served as a link to the U.S.-Mexico Border.

These streetcars were "retired" in 1939 to give way to the cheaper, Depression-era Presidents’ Conference Committee (PCC) streetcars. Today, only three of the original twenty-four Class 1 streetcars remain in existence.

San Diego and Arizona Railway

In 1919, Spreckels completed the San Diego and Arizona Railway, a short line American railroad, dubbed "The Impossible Railroad" by many engineers of its day due to the immense logistical challenges involved. Established in 1906 to provide San Diego with a direct rail link to the east by connecting with the Southern Pacific Railroad (which secretly provided the funding for the endeavor) lines in El Centro, California, the 148-mile (238-kilometer) route of the SD&A originated in San Diego and terminated in the Imperial County town of Calexico.

The total construction cost was approximately $18 million, or some $123,000 per mile; the original estimate was $6 million. Construction delays, attacks by Mexican revolutionaries, and government intervention during World War I all served to push the construction completion to November 15, 1919, when the "golden spike" was finally driven by none other than Spreckels himself. Completing the SD&A was a monumental task that seriously affected Spreckels' health, almost costing him his life.

In subsequent years, damage to the lines from heavy rainstorms, landslides, and fires took a financial toll on the railroad, as did border closings with Mexico. In 1932, financial difficulties forced Spreckels' heirs to sell their interests in the firm for $2.8 million to the Southern Pacific, which renamed the railroad the San Diego and Arizona Eastern Railway (SD&AE).

Southern California Mountain Water Company

Spreckels organized the Southern California Mountain Water Company, which in turn built the Morena and the Upper and Lower Otay Reservoir dams, the Dulzura conduit and the necessary pipeline to the city. The company was acquired by the City of San Diego.

Early automobile enthusiast 
Speckels was noted as one of the West Coast's "most prominent and enthusiastic automobilists."  When California began requiring license plates in 1905, Spreckels acquired the first five plates for himself and his family.

Death and legacy 
Spreckels died on June 7, 1926 in Coronado, San Diego, and was buried at Cypress Lawn Memorial Park, Colma. His biographer, Austin Adams, called him "one of America's few great Empire Builders who invested millions to turn a struggling, bankrupt village into the beautiful and cosmopolitan city San Diego is today."

Spreckels contributed to the cultural life of the city by building the Spreckels Theatre in San Diego, the first modern commercial playhouse west of the Mississippi. He gave generously to the fund to build the 1915 Panama-California Exposition and, together with his brother Adolph B. Spreckels, donated the Spreckels Organ Pavilion in Balboa Park to the people of San Diego just before the opening of the Exposition. Spreckels paid the salaries of a resident organ tuner and of the organist for many years, providing free daily organ concerts. 

Both Spreckels Elementary School in San Diego and Spreckels Park in Coronado, California, are named for him.

Notes

References
  Biography.
 
 
 History | The Home of the Historic San Diego Class 1 Streetcars
 
 San Diego Historical Society San Diego Biographies: John D. Spreckels (1853–1926) — accessed September 6, 2005.
 , Part 5, Chapter 6: "John D. Spreckels Solves the Railroad Problem"
 ,  v. 2, pp. 5–8: "John D. Spreckels"
 Nolan, John Matthew "2,543 Days: A History of the Hotel at the Grand Rapids Dam on the Wabash River" Discusses Charles T. Hinde, one of the silent investors of the Hotel del Coronado and how the Hotel del Coronado influenced the Grand Rapids Hotel in Wabash County, Illinois.

External links

 California AGHP — John D. Spreckels
  — History of the Inn and John D. Spreckels.
 The Home of the San Diego Historic Class 1 Streetcars
 "John D. Spreckels Solves the Railroad Problem" from The History of San Diego: 1542–1908 by William E. Smythe.
 "John D. Spreckels Lodge #657" Facebook page
 Spreckels Organ Society official website.

Businesspeople from San Diego
American real estate businesspeople
American railway entrepreneurs
19th-century American railroad executives
19th-century American newspaper publishers (people)
American newspaper publishers (people)
Philanthropists from California
Businesspeople from Charleston, South Carolina
Businesspeople from Hawaii
1853 births
1926 deaths
History of San Diego
The San Diego Union-Tribune people
Burials at Cypress Lawn Memorial Park